Crawshawbooth is a small village on the edge of the Pennine hills in England just north of the market town of Rawtenstall, Lancashire, and just south of Loveclough. It is part of the valley of Rossendale, an ancient royal hunting ground. The majority of surrounding land is farm and moor land and many walkers come to the area.

Historical aspects
There are a number of English Heritage properties here.

Crawshaw Hall is a Grade II* listed mansion built in 1831 by John Brooks, a well-known local calico printer and quarry owner. His son Sir Thomas Brooks was created a baronet in 1891 and the following year raised to the peerage as Baron Crawshaw. Sir Thomas was appointed High Sheriff of Lancashire for 1884–85. The property descended in the Brooks family until it was sold in 1976. It has been a medical centre and nursing home since 1987.

The Religious Society of Friends (Quakers) Meeting House in the village is one of the oldest in the world (it was built in 1716). The village has many historical aspects such as Victorian-style housing and huge chimneys from the early Victorian Era. There was also a large cotton and shoe making industry in the Victorian Era.

Goodshaw Chapel was associated with the Larks of Dean.

Life and tourism

The village has a small primary school, (Crawshawbooth Primary School) located outside of the main village. The village has a few shops and eating places including a fish and chip shop, an Indian restaurant, a cottage bakery, Chinese takeaway, and an Italian restaurant. There is also a newsagents, a dry cleaner and a public library as well as an award-winning butchers. The main road consists of a number of Victorian houses. The towns of Rawtenstall and Burnley and the hamlet of Loveclough are nearby.

Crawshawbooth was also home to the See Gallery who mounted regular exhibitions of local nationally and internationally known artists including, amongst others, Ray Lowry, Liam Spencer, Dave Pearson and John Hyatt.

Notable residents
 Raleigh Croshaw (ca.1584–1624) an English merchant and immigrant to the Colony and Dominion of Virginia
 Thomas Brooks, 1st Baron Crawshaw (1825–1908) a British peer.
 Marshall Brooks (1855-1944) sportsman, high jump champion, rugby union international and JP
 Jimmy Dickinson (1899–1971) footballer with almost 200 club caps
 Ted Robbins (born 1955) a comic, actor, TV presenter and radio broadcaster 
 Phil Neville (born 1977) footballer, played for Manchester United F.C., Everton F.C. and England

See also

Listed buildings in Rawtenstall

References

External links

 Crawshawbooth Public Library
 The See Gallery
 Crawshawbooth Directory

Villages in Lancashire
Geography of the Borough of Rossendale